Ophichthus tomioi is an eel in the family Ophichthidae (worm/snake eels). It was described by John E. McCosker in 2010. It is a marine, deep water-dwelling eel which is known from the Indo-Pacific, including the Philippines, the Seychelles Islands, Marquesas, and Fiji.

Etymology
The species epithet "tomioi" was given in honour of Tomio Iwamoto (b. 1939), an ichthyologist at the California Academy of Sciences. Iwamoto collected the holotype specimen.

References

Fish described in 2010
Taxa named by John E. McCosker
tomioi